Together 2016 was an ecumenical Christian event held at the National Mall in Washington, D.C. on July 16, 2016.  The event was scheduled to feature over 40 speakers, including Pope Francis, the leader of the Catholic Church, who made a video address to the attendees of the event. Other prominent speakers included the Christian apologist Ravi Zacharias and evangelist Samuel Rodriguez, as well as musicians Lecrae and Hillsong United. The event is the largest Christian event in the history of the United States. The organizer of the event Nick Hall, stated that "We believe it’s time to lift up a message of hope. There’s all kinds of division, so we’re praying for healing and we’re praying for change".

Although the event was originally scheduled to conclude at 9 p.m., it ended at 4 p.m. due to excessive heat. Officers reportedly responded to 350 medical calls for heat-related injuries. The large number of people who lost consciousness because of heat syncope overwhelmed emergency medical technicians.

2016 speakers

Apologists 
Ann Voskamp
Ravi Zacharias
Josh McDowell
Nabeel Qureshi

Clergy 
Francis Chan
Christine Caine
Luis Palau
Mark Batterson
Pope Francis
Ronnie Floyd
Samuel Rodriguez

Musicians 
Andy Mineo (cancelled)
Casting Crowns
Christine D'Clario
Crowder
Hillsong United
Jeremy Camp
Kari Jobe
KB
Kirk Franklin (cancelled)
Lacey Sturm (cancelled)
Lauren Daigle
Lecrae

Matt Maher
Matthew West
Michael W. Smith
Nick Hall
Passion
Tasha Cobbs
Tedashii
Trip Lee

References

External links 

Christian ecumenism
2016 in Christianity
2016 in Washington, D.C.